Fight+ was a European combat sports TV channel founded by David McConachie and Steffen Tangstad.

Fight+ showed movies, documentaries, classic and exclusive matches, training and educational programming and news. The plan was for Fight+ to become available all over Europe as fast as possible.

Fight+ closed down on December 11, 2006, according to CanalDigital website. According to the same website the channel is closing because there hasn't been enough interest from customers of CanalDigital, and they've also had problems finding new investors.

Countries where Fight+ was available
Denmark (March 1, 2006)
Finland (March 1, 2006)
Norway (March 1, 2006)
Sweden (March 1, 2006)

Programming
The channel broadcast programming on amateur and professional wrestling; boxing, kickboxing, Muay Thai, Mixed martial arts, Kung-Fu, judo and karate; cagefighting, bodybuilding, and strength athletics.

References

External links

Television channels and stations established in 2006
Television channels and stations disestablished in 2006
Pan-Nordic television channels
Sports television networks
Defunct television channels in Denmark
Defunct television channels in Norway
Defunct television channels in Sweden
Defunct television channels in Finland